is a spin-off of The Street Fighter (1974). The plot revolves around Lǐ Hóng-Lóng (李紅竜 Li Kōryū), the female martial artist of the title. When her brother Lǐ Wàn-Qīng is kidnapped by drug lords, she seeks revenge. The drug lord's colorful collection of "killers" includes a toga-clad group of Thai Boxers called the "Amazons Seven", along with representatives of almost every martial art. Hóng-Lóng breaks into the drug lord's compound with the help of Seiichi Hibiki (Sonny Chiba) and other members of the Shorinji Kempo dojo. After all of his minions are defeated, the drug lord himself battles Hóng-Lóng, wearing a steel claw in imitation of Han, the villain from Enter the Dragon (1973). This was the first in a trilogy of films. It was followed by Sister Street Fighter: Hanging by a Thread (1974) and The Return of the Sister Street Fighter (1975), each with Shihomi as star.

Plot
When Lee Long (Hiroshi Miyauchi), a shorinji kempo champion and Hong Kong drug agent, goes missing during an investigation into the activities of a dummy corporation called Central Export, his sister, Tina (Sue Shiomi), is called in to continue the investigation in his place. On her way to Club Mandarin, she visits her uncle (Harry Kondo), who operates a restaurant, and her cousins Jerry (Tatsuya Nanjo) and Remi (Nami Tachibana). At Club Mandarin, she receives a red rose, the signal to look for Lee's partner in the investigation, Fanny Singer (Xiè Xiù-Róng). When assassins for Central Export abduct Fanny, Tina takes them on single-handedly, but they manage to capture Fanny and load her in their car, which is then hijacked by shorinji kempo student Sonny Hibachi (Sonny Chiba), who proceeds to transport her to the ballet studio operated by his girlfriend, Shinobu Kojo (Sanae Ohori).

Furious at his minions for failing him, Ryozo Hayashi (Shohei Yamamoto) hires a mercenary, Hammerhead (Milton Ishibashi), to spy on the shorinji kempo school, led by Tetsudo Fujita (Asao Uchida). When Tina stops by, she's formally introduced to Sonny and another student, Emmy Kawasaki (May Hayakawa). After Sonny assures Tina that Fanny's all right, she hurries over to Kojo's ballet studio to question Fanny. After Fanny reveals that Lee was captured, she gives Tina a necklace before spasming from a lack of exposure to heroin, which she had been forcefully addicted to, as Hammerhead's minions attack the ballet studio. Tina and Kojo successfully ward them off, but Fanny is killed in a sneak attack using a poison dart.

Some time later, Emmy swears the shorinji kempo school's allegiance to Tina in her investigation as she stumbles across another piece of evidence in the form of a lock of hair. Central Export's leader, Kaki (Bin Amatsu), offers Hammerhead a great reward if he disposes of Tina. After Tina clears out several minions, she encounters Hammerhead, and they fight on a bridge. Hammerhead reveals the truth to Tina, that Lee is still alive and captive in Kaki's dungeon, before sending her off the bridge into an apparent watery grave. Emmy does her own espionage work and helps Tina destroy a warehouse owned by Central Export.

Though Kaki is furious at Hammerhead, he allows him and his minions to directly attack the shorinji kempo school with the hope that the attack will also lead to Tina's demise in the process. Sonny successfully wards off the ambush in a one-on-one duel against Hammerhead himself, though, and when Hammerhead subsequently sinks into a depression and starts to drink himself to death, a frustrated Kaki is forced to use her uncle against her by forcing him to divulge a false lead. Kaki believes Tina will be killed by his minions, but Tina manages to stop them. She returns to her uncle's restaurant with Emmy just as he's killed by a poison dart in front of Jerry and Remi.

Tina returns to Central Export and enters the dungeon, where she extracts Lee right before a sinister minister wielding an arrow gun offs him before her eyes. Tina herself is dropped into a pit and nearly killed when Kaki ties her by her feet above a bed of spikes, but as he burns the rope she breaks free and throws his mistress onto the bed of spikes. She then proceeds to take down several more minions before confronting Hayashi and killing him by twisting his neck. Sonny, Emmy, and Kojo arrive as backup and kill many of the remaining minions, including Hammerhead. Tina takes on Kaki herself and kills him with his own claw hand.

Alternate versions
Similar to its predecessors, Sister Street Fighter was initially rated X when first presented to the MPAA. New Line then cut 6 minutes of graphic footage, removing all shots with considerable amounts of blood and gore. Additionally, Etsuko Shihomi was deliberately credited with the more Western name of Sue Shiomi.

Brentwood Communications, who had previously released a public domain DVD of this censored version, eventually released the uncut version on DVD and Blu-ray, in Japanese with English subtitles.

Cast
NOTE: English-translated names, if given or known, will be in parentheses:
 Etsuko Shihomi (Sue Shiomi) - Lǐ Hónglóng (Li Kōryū/Tina Long)
 Emi (May) Hayakawa - Emi Hayakawa (Emmy Kawasaki)
 Sanae Ōhori - Shinobu Kojō
 Xiè Xiùróng - Fanshin (Fanny Singer)
 Hiroshi (Harry) Kondō - Lǐ Yùtáng (Li Gyokudō)
 Tatsuya Nanjō - Jirō (Jerry)
 Nami Tachibana - Reiko (Remi)
 Hiroshi Miyauchi - Lǐ Wànqīng (Li Mansei/Lee Long)
 Bin Amatsu - Shigetomi Kakuzaki (Kaki)
 Shōhei Yamamoto - Ryōzō Hayashi
 Seiya Satō - Murakami
 Toshiyuki Tsuchiyama - Kurokawa
 Tatsuya Kameyama - Shimura
 Teruo Shimizu - Hamano
 Masashi (Milton) Ishibashi - Kazunao Inubashiri (Hammerhead)
 Kengo Miyaji - Kizaki
 Shinichi (Sonny) Chiba - Sonny Hibachi

Reception
The film is generally well received. Fans cite Hiroshi Miyauchi's excellent martial arts skills and the variety of battle. Detractors state there is flat acting and over-reliance on wire special effect, especially during the final battle. Also, Sonny Chiba's "Tsurugi" character doesn't appear, despite the English title.

Home media
In November 2007, BCI Eclipse released the film in their Sonny Chiba Collection DVD set, which also includes Golgo 13: Assignment Kowloon, The Bullet Train, Dragon Princess, Karate Kiba, and Karate Warriors. A year earlier, they released the whole Sister Street Fighter Movie Collection with the their original Japanese mono and a 5.1 remix, English-dubbed versions and optional English subtitles. In 2019, Arrow Films re-released the collection in Blu-Ray with high definition digital transfers of all the films.

References

External links
 

1974 films
1970s action films
1974 martial arts films
Films directed by Kazuhiko Yamaguchi
Japanese action films
The Street Fighter
1970s Japanese-language films
Toei Company films
Films scored by Shunsuke Kikuchi
1970s Japanese films